Guliskhan Nakhbayeva (born 20 June 1991) is a chess player from Kazakhstan. She received the FIDE titles of Woman Grandmaster (WGM) in 2012 and International Master (IM) in 2018.

Nakhbayeva competed in the FIDE Women's Grand Prix 2013–14. She also competed in Chess at the 2010 Asian Games – Women's individual rapid. She was a member of the Kazakhstan Women Chess Olympic Team 2008-2014. Nakhbayeva was the top seed in the 2014 Kazakhstan Chess Championships for Women, a tournament in which she won the championship by the score of 7.5/9 points to finish a full point ahead of the second-place finisher. In doing so, Nakhbayeva won the Kazakhstani championship four years in a row. In 2018 Nakhbayeva participated in the Women's World Chess Championship and placed 28th in the tournament. In 2019, she tied for first place in the Kazakhstan Cup Final for Women with Tomilova Elena.

References

External links
 
 Guliskhan Nakhbayeva  games and profile at Chess-DB.com

1991 births
Living people
Kazakhstani female chess players
Chess woman grandmasters
Asian Games competitors for Kazakhstan
Chess players at the 2010 Asian Games
21st-century Kazakhstani women